Acworth may refer to:

People
Acworth (surname)

Places
 Acworth, Georgia, US
 Lake Acworth, lake in Acworth, Georgia
 Acworth, New Hampshire, US

See also 
 Ackworth (disambiguation)